James Irvin may refer to:
 James Irvin (politician)
 James Irvin (fighter)

See also
 James Irvine (disambiguation)